William Morris Reade (1787 – 31 March 1847) was an Irish Conservative politician.

He married Elizabeth Maitland, daughter of Patrick Maitland and Anne née Bateman on 6 February 1827, with whom he had two children: William Morris Reade (1830–1886), and Louisa Reade (died 1918).

References

External links
 

1787 births
1847 deaths
UK MPs 1841–1847
Irish Conservative Party MPs